Shougang Group Co., Ltd., formerly Shougang Corporation  is a Chinese state-owned steel company. Based in Beijing, its Shijingshan district operations were moved out of the city prior to the Olympics due to concerns over pollution.

Its subsidiary and listed company, Beijing Shougang Co., Ltd., was established in 1999 and listed on the Shenzhen Stock Exchange in 2005. It also has 3 other subsidiaries listed on the Stock Exchange of China Hong Kong, Shougang Concord International, Shougang Concord Century, and Shougang Concord Grand .

The word "Shougang" is an abbreviation of its Chinese name, meaning "Capital Steel". Some publications also use Capital Iron and Steel Corporation as the translation of the name.

History

The predecessor of Shougang, Shijingshan Steel Plant, was founded in 1919 in Shijingshan District, with accelerated growth since the founding of People's Republic of China in 1949. Shougang focuses its business mainly on steel industry, the corporation also runs on mining, machinery and equipment development, electronics, building, real estate, and related services, in addition, they also developed business with overseas companies in order to form Shougang as a leading multi-diverse corporation.

The Shijingshan steel mill was shut down in 2011, thus becoming Shougang Park. Big Air Shougang, one of the venues of 2022 Winter Olympics, is built inside the former factory in 2019.

Foreign operations
The company has current operations in the pacific coast of Southern Perú and is known as Shougang Hierro Perú. It operates the Marcona Mine in the Marcona District, an open-pit iron mine acquired in 1992. There have been continuing labor troubles.

Sponsorship
The group was a sponsor of a football team and a basketball team.

References

External links
 

Manufacturing companies established in 1919
Steel companies of China
Companies owned by the provincial government of China
Manufacturing companies based in Beijing
Chinese companies established in 1919
1919 establishments in China